Jo Ann Kelly (5 January 1944 – 21 October 1990) was an English blues singer and guitarist. She is respected for her strong blues vocal style and for playing country blues guitar.

Early life
Kelly was born in Streatham, South London, England on 5 January 1944. She had two younger siblings, Susan and Dave. Her early interest in performing music grew out of hearing the Everly Brothers, Elvis Presley, Little Richard and Skiffle in the late 1950s. She learned 3 or 4 guitar chords from her younger brother, Dave Kelly.

Career
She appeared on several compilation albums with her first in 1966 being New Sounds In Folk and then two years later on Blues Anytime Vol. 1: An Anthology Of British Blues (1968) Immediate Records before releasing her first solo album titled Jo-Ann Kelly (1969), this was issued on CBS in the UK and Epic Records in the US.  She was also a core member of Tramp (band) along with her brother Dave Kelly.

Jo-Ann Kelly and her brother Dave helped raise donations for Memphis Minnie in the 1960s.

Canned Heat and Johnny Winter both tried to recruit Kelly, but she preferred to stay in the United Kingdom. She expanded to the European club circuit, where she worked with guitarist Pete Emery and other bands.  In the early 1980s, she was a member of the Terry Smith Blues Band.

Death
In 1988, Kelly began to suffer from headaches. In 1989 she had an operation to remove a malignant brain tumour. She died on 21 October 1990, aged 46.

Obituaries for Kelly appeared in major UK newspapers, including The Independent, The Times, and The Guardian. Remembrances and obituaries also appeared in contemporary Blues magazines such as Blues & Rhythm and the British Blues Review

The obituary in The Independent remarked, "To many American performers Jo Ann Kelly was the only British singer to earn their respect for her development of what they would be justified in thinking as 'their' genre".

Discography

Primary releases
 Jo-Ann Kelly: Blues & Gospel (No label, 1968) – EP with four songs, pressing limited to 99 copies. All original recordings are included on Retrospect 1964-72.
 Jo-Ann Kelly (Epic, 1969)
 Same Thing on Their Minds (Sunset, 1969) – With Tony McPhee.
 Jo Ann Kelly With John Fahey, Woody Mann, John Miller, Alan Seidler (Blue Goose, 1972)
 Do It (Red Rag, 1976) – With Peter Emery.
 Just Restless, The Jo Ann Kelly Band (Appaloosa, 1984)
 Jo Ann (Open, 1988)
 Woman in (E)Motion Festival (Tradition & Moderne, 1995) – Recorded in Germany, 1988.

Compilations

 Retrospect 1964-72 (Connoisseur Collection Document, 1990)
 Key To The Highway: Rare And Unissued Recordings 1968-1974 (Mooncrest, 1999)
 Talkin' Low: Rare And Unissued Recordings 1966-1988, volume 2 (Mooncrest, 2000)
 Tramp 1974: Rare And Unissued Recordings, volume 3 (Mooncrest, 2001)
 Black Rat Swing: The Collectors' Jo Ann Kelly (Castle, 2003)
 Blues & Gospel: Rare and Unreleased Recordings (Blues Matters!, 2004)
 Do It & more (Manhaton, 2008) – Songs from Do It (1976) plus additional songs.
 I Asked For Water, She Gave Me Gasoline (Imperial – LP-12455 1969)

Featured

 Standing At The Burying Ground, Mississippi Fred McDowell (Red Lightnin', 1984) – Recorded live at the Mayfair Hotel, London, UK, 8 March 1969, featuring Jo Ann Kelly, liner notes by Jo Ann Kelly.
 Been Here And Gone, Woody Mann & Jo Ann Kelly & Son House (Acoustic Music Records, 1999) – Recorded 1971–72, Kelly plays on eight songs.
 Memphis 69': The 1969 Memphis Country Blues Festival.Concert film,played one song,accompanied by Guitarist,"Backwards" Sam Firk. Directed by Joe LaMatting/Produced by Bruce Watson&Lisa LaMattina. Executive Producer: Mathew Johnson,Bruce Watson&Gene Rosenthal.Fat Possum Records, 2019.

See also
 List of British blues musicians
 British blues
 Tony McPhee
 John Dummer Band
 Tramp (band)

References

External links
 Illustrated Jo Ann Kelly discography
 

1944 births
1990 deaths
People from Streatham
20th-century English singers
English blues guitarists
English blues singers
English women guitarists
Deaths from brain cancer in England
Musicians from London
Place of death missing
20th-century British guitarists
20th-century English women singers
Tramp (band) members
John Dummer Band members
20th-century women guitarists